Burnt Evidence is a 1954 British thriller film directed by Daniel Birt and starring Jane Hylton, Duncan Lamont and Donald Gray. The film was produced by Ronald Kinnoch for ACT Films. It was made as a second feature. Shooting took place at Beaconsfield Studios and on location in Hammersmith. The film's sets were designed by the art director Ray Simm.

Plot
Diana Taylor is considering leaving her husband, Jack, who has been trying but failing to build his own business as a builder/decorator. Her suitor, Jimmy Thompson, is Jack's army friend.

Jack deduces the relationship and, when Jimmy comes to Jack's business to discuss the situation, a fight ensues. A gun is produced and one of them is killed, but a subsequent fire makes it difficult to determine which man has died. While the police search for the survivor, Diana struggles with her feelings.

Cast
 Jane Hylton as Diana Taylor 
 Duncan Lamont as Jack Taylor 
 Donald Gray as Jimmy Thompson 
 Meredith Edwards as Bob Edwards 
 Cyril Smith as Alf Quinney 
 Irene Handl as Mrs. Raymond 
 Hugo Schuster as Hartl 
 Kynaston Reeves as Pathologist
 Hugh Moxey as Assistant Commissioner
 Tony Hilton as Tubby
 Stanley Vilven as Attwood
 Hamilton Keene as Fire Officer 
 Gwen Bacon as Mrs. Thompson
 Jack Taylor	as	Detective Sergeant Dutton 
 Arthur Lovegrove as  Fireman
 Stratford Johns as Fireman

Critical reception
TV Guide called it a "Routine thriller"; while Sky Cinema called it a "Relentlessly sombre thriller."

References

External links
 

1954 films
1950s thriller films
British thriller films
1950s English-language films
Films directed by Daniel Birt
Films with screenplays by Ted Willis, Baron Willis
British black-and-white films
Films shot in London
Films shot at Beaconsfield Studios
1950s British films